The 1943-44 Palestine League was the tenth season of league football in the British Mandate for Palestine. The defending champions were Maccabi Tel Aviv.

Fourteen clubs took part in the league. the league schedule was inconsistent, as no club completed playing the 26 games.

The championship was won by Hapoel Tel Aviv.

League table

References
RSSSF
Previous seasons The Israel Football Association 

Palestine League seasons
Palestine
1943–44 in Mandatory Palestine football